North Harbour Island is an island in Ontario, Canada, located in Lake Erie, approximately 14.5 kms west of the nearest point on Pelee Island.  The tiny, privately owned island has one home and a storage shed.

References

Islands of Lake Erie in Ontario
Private islands of Canada
Private islands of the Great Lakes